Eugenia Mandal is a Polish social psychologist, holder of a postdoctoral degree in Psychology (Ph.D. degree: 1990, University of Silesia; postdoctoral degree: 2000, Polish Academy of Science - Departament of Psychology). She is currently a professor in the Department of Psychology at University of Silesia, Poland.

A supervisor of the Department of Social and Environmental Psychology.

She is an author of numerous researches in the field of Gender Psychology: femininity and masculinity, gender stereotypes, gender differences Psychology, and she is also an author of such issues like close relationships, social influence, authority, autopresentation, attractiveness and image of a body. 
She is an author of numerous books and articles. She has participated in creating two reports about women and men in Poland for World Bank.

Affiliate: Polskie Towarzystwo Psychologiczne (Polish Psychology Society), Polskie Stowarzyszenie Psychologii Społecznej (Polish Social Psychology Association), European Association of Social Psychology, European Network on Conflict, Gender, and Violence oraz International Forum for Women.

Selected publications 

Books

 Podmiotowe i interpersonalne konsekwencje stereotypów związanych z płcią [Subjective and interpersonal consequences of the stereotypes related to gender]. Katowice: Wydawnictwo Uniwersytetu Śląskiego (2000) 
 Kobiecość i męskość. Popularne opinie a badania naukowe [Femininity and masculinity. Popular opinions and scientific researches]. Warszawa: Wydawnictwo Akademickie Żak (2003) 
 Podmiotowe i interpersonalne konsekwencje stereotypów związanych z płcią [Subjective and interpersonal consequences of the stereotypes related to gender. Revised edition]. Wydanie drugie zmienione. Katowice: Wydawnictwo Uniwersytetu Śląskiego (2004) 
 Miłość, władza i manipulacja w bliskich związkach [Love, authority and manipulation in close relationships]. Warszawa: Wydawnictwo Naukowe PWN (2008) 

Scientific reports

 Gender and Economic Opportunities in Poland. Document of the  World Bank. Report No 29205-POL, March 15, 2004. The World Bank, Warsaw Office, Edition I, Warsaw (2004) 
 Growth, Employment and Living Standards in Poland. Document of the World Bank. Report No. 28233-POL, March 22, 2004. The World Bank, Warsaw Office, Edition I, Warsaw (2004) 

Scientific Editor

 Współczesne problemy socjalizacji [Contemporary problems of socialization]. Katowice: Wydawnictwo Uniwersytetu Śląskiego (1995, współredakcja Stefańska-Klar R.) ISSN 0239-6432
 Tożsamość społeczno-kulturowa płci [Social-cultural identity of gender]. Opole: Wydawnictwo Uniwersytetu Opolskiego. (2005, współredakcja Barska A.) 
 W kręgu gender [In gender circle]. Katowice: Wydawnictwo Uniwersytetu Śląskiego.(2007).

References 

Polish psychologists
Polish women psychologists
Living people
University of Silesia in Katowice alumni
Academic staff of the University of Silesia in Katowice
Polish women academics
Year of birth missing (living people)